Dowlatabad Rural District is in the Central District of Marand County, East Azerbaijan province, Iran. At the National Census of 2006, its population was 13,022 in 3,230 households. There were 12,760 inhabitants in 3,684 households at the following census of 2011. At the most recent census of 2016, the population of the rural district was 12,170 in 3,661 households. The largest of its nine villages was Dowlatabad, with 3,868 people.

References 

Marand County

Rural Districts of East Azerbaijan Province

Populated places in East Azerbaijan Province

Populated places in Marand County